Entwined is a rhythm video game developed by Pixelopus and published by Sony Computer Entertainment for the PlayStation 4 in June 2014. It was ported to the PlayStation 3 and PlayStation Vita in July 2014. The game was announced at Sony's E3 media briefing on June 9, 2014 and was released worldwide on the PlayStation Store for the PlayStation 4 on the same day. The PlayStation 3 and PlayStation Vita version were released approximately a month later, and since Entwined is a cross-buy title, these two versions are available at no extra cost for anyone who has purchased the PlayStation 4 version.

Plot
The story is about two souls, a bird and a fish, that are in love but can't be together. Once united, the two souls will transform into a magnificent soaring dragon.

Gameplay
The player is tasked with guiding the two souls simultaneously, one with each analog stick, to bring them together over the course of many lifetimes. The left analog stick controls the fish, while the right analog stick controls the bird.

Release
Entwined was released for the PlayStation 3, PlayStation 4, and PlayStation Vita in June 2014.

Reception

Entwined received "mixed" reviews according to the review aggregation website Metacritic.

The Digital Fix gave it a score of eight out of ten and said that the game "blends its gameplay, visuals and soundtrack into one beautiful piece of art that should be experienced by anyone who has the chance to play it." However, The Escapist gave it three stars out of five and stated, "While its skin-deep qualities suggest something artistic and maybe a little philosophical, this middling arcade game packs not enough wallop to be worth more than a bit of a shrug. While not awful, it's certainly not intriguing enough to maintain interest even in spite of a brief running time." National Post gave it five out of ten and stated that the game "never manages to deliver much beyond art and beauty."

References

External links
 

2014 video games
Music video games
PlayStation 3 games
PlayStation 4 games
PlayStation Network games
PlayStation Vita games
Video games developed in the United States

Single-player video games
Sony Interactive Entertainment games